Water balloon launcher, which is also known as water balloon slingshot, is a ballistic toy device, for shooting water balloons at significantly longer range than by hand-throwing, and that is used in well-prepared water balloon fights. Both home-made and toy manufacturers models exist, with some models being stationary and some 3-person operated, also mobile handheld wrist launchers exist on the market. Even though water balloon launchers are mainly marketed towards children, adults also engage in water balloon activities. Some supreme water balloon launchers are capable of throwing 300 yards or more. It is unsafe to use water balloon launcher to throw snowballs.

Dangers
For young children water balloon launchers pose a potential risk of choking hazard and eye injuries. A case has been reported where young man suffered orbital blowout fracture, and thus became legally blind from his left eye. In another case, a 31-year-old female suffered from traumatic retinal dialysis in her right eye, resulting in permanent visual loss.

References

External links
Water Balloon Launcher | Building Guide | Stationary Model
Water Balloon Slingshot | Building Guide | 3-Person Model

Water toys
Toy weapons
Projectile weapons